Robert Barrington (died 1642) was the member of parliament for Newton on the Isle of Wight, England, 1628–1629.

Life
Barrington was the second son of Joan and Francis Barrington and lived in Hatfield. He was a cousin of Oliver Cromwell. His brother Thomas succeeded to the baronetcy and also was an MP for Newton. His son, also Francis Barrington, joined the New Model Army and joined the forces of Robert Venables in the Western Design serving as Lt.-Colonel in the regiment of Anthony Buller.

References

1642 deaths
Younger sons of baronets
Year of birth missing
English MPs 1628–1629